Ashareh-ye Olya (also Romanized as ‘Ashāreh-ye ‘Olyā and ‘Ashāreh ‘Olyā; also known as ‘Ashāreh-ye Bālā) is a village in Chah Salem Rural District, in the Central District of Omidiyeh County, Khuzestan Province, Iran. At the 2006 census, its population was 89, in 19 families.

References 

Populated places in Omidiyeh County